Hanna-Barbera's All-Star Comedy Ice Revue (onscreen title: Hanna-Barbera's All-Star Comedy Ice Review) is a 1978 American live-action/animated television special produced by Hanna-Barbera Productions (in association with deFaria Productions) featuring animated character Fred Flintstone and hosted by Roy Clark and Bonnie Franklin. It premiered on CBS on Friday, January 13, 1978 at 8:00 pm EST.

Summary
The show was a celebrity roast honoring Fred Flintstone on his 48th birthday, and included the following costumed Hanna-Barbera characters: Yogi Bear, Jabberjaw, Huckleberry Hound, Scooby-Doo, The Banana Splits, Hong Kong Phooey, Quick Draw McGraw, Snagglepuss, Wally Gator and The Hair Bear Bunch.

The show's presenters were Roy Clark and Bonnie Franklin, and included guest stars The Sylvers, British comedy duo Course & Young (Mike Course and Bob Young), the Fenton kids (Jack, Robin, Todd and Lisa), Sashi Kuchiki, the Ice Capettes and a special appearance by The Skatebirds (whose Saturday morning series was airing on CBS at the time). Throughout the special, the live-action celebrity roast sequences are interspersed with animated segments featuring Fred Flintstone and Barney Rubble.

When Clark and Franklin announce the guest of honor, Fred and Barney are at home watching the event on TV. Fred suddenly realizes he thought the event was scheduled for the following night. As Fred and Barney rush to the ice arena, the show continues with musical numbers, ice displays including a comedy team, precision skating, disco-on-ice, jazz skating and an acrobatic number with fiery torches. When a costumed Fred finally arrives, the guests perform a "Happy Birthday" salute.

Musical numbers
 "You Are My Lucky Star" – Performed by Bonnie Franklin
 "We're in the Money" – Performed by the Ice Capettes
 "Disco Showdown" – Performed by The Sylvers
 "Theme from Love Story" – Performed by Roy Clark (guitar solo)

Voices
Henry Corden – Fred Flintstone
Mel Blanc – Barney Rubble
Daws Butler – Hair Bear, Huckleberry Hound, Snagglepuss, Yogi Bear, Quick Draw McGraw, Bingo
William Callaway – Square Bear
Paul Winchell – Bubi Bear, Fleegle
Allan Melvin – Drooper
Don Messick – Jabberjaw, Snorky, Scooby-Doo

Home media
Hanna-Barbera's All-Star Comedy Ice Revue has never been rebroadcast on television but was released on VHS in November 1986 by Worldvision Home Video.

External links

1978 television specials
CBS television specials
1970s American television specials
American films with live action and animation
Musical television specials
Ice shows
Television shows directed by Walter C. Miller
Hanna-Barbera television specials
The Flintstones television specials
Yogi Bear television specials
Huckleberry Hound specials
Scooby-Doo specials
The Banana Splits
1970s in comedy
Animated crossover television specials